Bohrer is a German occupational surname literally meaning "one who bores/drills." Notable people with this name include:
Brian Bohrer (born 1960), American pastor and author
Corinne Bohrer (born 1958), American movie and television actress
Doris Bohrer (1923–2016), American intelligence operative
Florence Fifer Bohrer (1877–1960), American politician
Florin Berenguer Bohrer (born 1989), French footballer
Karl Heinz Bohrer (1932–2021), German literary scholar and essayist
Thomas Bohrer (born 1963), American rower

References

German-language surnames